Darfield United F.C. was an English association football club based in Darfield, Barnsley, South Yorkshire.

History
The club was formed early in the 20th century, and remained in existence for just over a decade, during which time they won the Barnsley Association League and entered the FA Cup.

Honours
Barnsley Association League
Champions - 1912/13

Records
Best FA Cup performance: 3rd Qualifying Round, 1912–13

References

Defunct football clubs in South Yorkshire
Sheffield Association League
Barnsley Association League